I Gusti Ngurah Made Agung (1876-1906) was the king of Badung, Bali who died in battle during the Dutch intervention in Bali (1906). He was declared a National Hero of Indonesia by President Joko Widodo in 2015.

Biography
I Gusti Ngurah Made Agung was born on April 5, 1876 in Denpasar, Bali and became the seventh king of Badung in 1902. During his reign, he wrote a number of Balinese language works, many of which had anti-colonial themes, including Geguritan Dharma Sasana, Geguritan Niti Raja Sasana, Geguritan Nengah Jimbaran, Kidung Loda, Kakawin Atlas, and Geguritan Hredaya Sastra.

The Dutch used the pretext of a stranded ship flying under the Dutch flag, the Sri Kumala, to step up its aggression against Badung. The ship was stranded Sanur Beach on May 27, 1904 and the Dutch accused the kingdom of pillaging the ship and refusing compensation. This led to the Dutch enforcing a blockade against Badung from November 1904 onwards.
During the Dutch intervention in Bali (1906), in September 1906 the Royal Netherlands East Indies Army invaded Bali. After the bombardment of his kingdom on September 20, I Gusti Ngurah Made Agung was forced to react. Despite not having modern weapons, he fatally led his troops against the Dutch in a battle to the death (the Puputan Badung).

In November 2015 he was declared a National Hero of Indonesia by President Joko Widodo.

References

1876 births
1906 deaths